A façade (also written facade) is generally the front part or exterior of a building. It is a loan word from the French , which means 'frontage' or 'face'.

In architecture, the façade of a building is often the most important aspect from a design standpoint, as it sets the tone for the rest of the building. From the engineering perspective, the façade is also of great importance due to its impact on energy efficiency. For historical façades, many local zoning regulations or other laws greatly restrict or even forbid their alteration.

Etymology
The word is a loanword from the French , which in turn comes from the Italian , from  meaning 'face', ultimately from post-classical Latin . The earliest usage recorded by the Oxford English Dictionary is 1656.

Façades added to earlier buildings
It was quite common in the Georgian period for existing houses in English towns to be given a fashionable new façade. For example, in the city of Bath, The Bunch of Grapes in Westgate Street appears to be a Georgian building, but the appearance is only skin deep and some of the interior rooms still have Jacobean plasterwork ceilings.

This new construction has happened also in other places: in Santiago de Compostela the three-metre-deep Casa do Cabido was built to match the architectural order of the square, and the main Churrigueresque façade of the Santiago de Compostela Cathedral, facing the Praza do Obradoiro, is actually encasing and concealing the older Portico of Glory.

High rise façades
In modern high rise building, the exterior walls are often suspended from the concrete floor slabs. Examples include curtain walls and precast concrete walls. The façade can at times be required to have a fire-resistance rating, for instance, if two buildings are very close together, to lower the likelihood of fire spreading from one building to another.

In general, the façade systems that are suspended or attached to the precast concrete slabs will be made from aluminium (powder coated or anodized) or stainless steel. In recent years more lavish materials such as titanium have sometimes been used, but due to their cost and susceptibility to panel edge staining these have not been popular.

Whether rated or not, fire protection is always a design consideration. The melting point of aluminium, is typically reached within minutes of the start of a fire. Fire stops for such building joints can be qualified, too. Putting fire sprinkler systems on each floor has a profoundly positive effect on the fire safety of buildings with curtain walls.

The extended use of new materials like polymers, resulted in an increase of high-rise building façade fires over the past few years, since they are more flammable than traditional materials.

Some building codes also limit the percentage of window area in exterior walls. When the exterior wall is not rated, the perimeter slab edge becomes a junction where rated slabs are abutting an unrated wall. For rated walls, one may also choose rated windows and fire doors, to maintain that wall's rating.

Film sets and theme parks
On a film set and within most themed attractions, many of the buildings are only façade, which are far cheaper than actual buildings, and not subject to building codes (within film sets).  In film sets, they are simply held up with supports from behind, and sometimes have boxes for actors to step in and out of from the front if necessary for a scene. Within theme parks, they are usually decoration for the interior ride or attraction, which is based on a simple building design.

Examples

See also

 Curtain wall (architecture)
 Double-skin facade
 Façadism
 Potemkin village

References

Citations

Sources 

 Façades: Principles of Construction. By Ulrich Knaack, Tillmann Klein, Marcel Bilow and Thomas Auer. Boston/Basel/Berlin: Birkhaüser-Verlag, 2007.  (German)  (English)
 Giving buildings an illusion of grandeur
 Facades of Casas Chorizo in Buenos Aires, Argentina

Further reading

 The article outlines the development of the facade in ecclesiastical architecture from the early Christian period to the Renaissance.

Architectural elements
Building engineering